Rogi  is a village in the administrative district of Gmina Podegrodzie, within Nowy Sącz County, Lesser Poland Voivodeship, in southern Poland.

It is the birthplace of Polish artist Ludwik Lizoń.

References

External links
 Jozef Lizon - local artist who provides the monumental sculpture heritage park in Rogi

Rogi